The 2019–20 All-Ireland Intermediate Club Hurling Championship was the 16th staging of the All-Ireland Intermediate Club Hurling Championship, the Gaelic Athletic Association's intermediate inter-county club hurling tournament. The championship began on 12 October 2019 and ended on 18 January 2020.

On 18 January 2020, Tullaroan won the championship after a 3-19 to 5-12 defeat of Fr. O'Neill's in the All-Ireland final at Croke Park. This was their first ever championship title.

Declan Dalton from the Fr. O'Neill's club was the championship's top scorer with 5-42.

Provincial championships

Connacht Intermediate Club Hurling Championship

Quarter-final

Semi-final

Final

Leinster Intermediate Club Hurling Championship

First round

Quarter-finals

Semi-finals

Final

Munster Intermediate Club Hurling Championship

Quarter-finals

Semi-finals

Final

Ulster Intermediate Club Hurling Championship

Quarter-finals

Semi-finals

Final

All-Ireland Intermediate Club Hurling Championship

Semi-finals

Final

Championship statistics

Top scorers

Top scorers overall

Top scorers in a single game

References

External links
 2019 Munster Club Championship fixtures 

All-Ireland Intermediate Club Hurling Championship
All-Ireland Intermediate Club Hurling Championship
All-Ireland Intermediate Club Hurling Championship